Brooksville is a town on Penobscot Bay in Hancock County, Maine, United States. As of the 2020 census, the town population was 935. It contains the villages of North Brooksville, South Brooksville (on Buck's Harbor), West Brooksville, Brooksville Corner, and Harborside (on Cape Rosier).

History

The Brooksville area was inhabited by Native Americans of the Wabanaki confederation since ancient times. According to the Brooksville Historical Society there is a story, difficult to confirm, that Englishmen massacred a Wabanaki village at Walker Pond some time between 1690 and 1704.

Brooksville's first English settlers were John Wasson, Samuel Wasson and David Hawes, soldiers in the Revolutionary War. Incorporated on June 13, 1817, the town was formed from parts of Castine, Penobscot and Sedgwick. It was named Brooksville after Governor John Brooks of Massachusetts, who then governed Maine.

The surface of the town abounds with granite, and several quarries were established. The soil is a clay loam, which yielded wheat and potatoes. Buck's Harbor, safe and deep, is one of the best coves in the region for small boats, and many residents became involved in the coasting trade and fisheries. By 1880, when the population was 1,419, Brooksville had a porgy oil factory, two sawmills, a shingle mill, a planing mill, two gristmills, a wool carding mill, and a cloth and yarn factory. Shipping was an industry, with ship repairs done at the foot of Wasson's Wharf Road with a pier to the channel in the Bagaduce. There was a brickyard, blacksmith's shop, rope walk and small store for provisions. As late as 1912, there were 18 schooners at the wharf under repair. A small packet, the Goldenrod, ferried passengers from Brooksville to Castine and there was a pier to the south where the Belfast boat berthed. The Wasson and Tapley families, related by marriage, had numerous ship's captains, the most notable being the six Tapley sons of Captain Robert Tapley, who all followed the sea after their father.

Brooksville's Cape Rosier is named after James Rosier, an early explorer of the Penobscot River.

Geography

Brooksville is bounded on the west by Penobscot Bay, on the north and east by the Bagaduce River, a tidal estuary, and on the south by Eggemoggin Reach. It is nearly an island, with just two slim land bridges to the rest of the mainland, and has  of shoreline.

Brooksville is crossed by state routes 175 and 176.

Demographics

2010 census

As of the census of 2010, there were 934 people, 437 households, and 292 families living in the town. The racial makeup of the town was 95.6% White, 0.2% Native American, 1.9% Asian, 0.5% from other races, and 1.7% from two or more races. Hispanic or Latino of any race were 1.1% of the population.

There were 437 households, of which 20.4% had children under the age of 18 living with them, 57.0% were married couples living together, 6.9% had a female householder with no husband present, 3.0% had a male householder with no wife present, and 33.2% were non-families. 26.1% of all households were made up of individuals, and 11.2% had someone living alone who was 65 years of age or older. The average household size was 2.14 and the average family size was 2.52.

The median age in the town was 53 years. 15.3% of residents were under the age of 18; 5.8% were between the ages of 18 and 24; 18% were from 25 to 44; 35.7% were from 45 to 64; and 25.2% were 65 years of age or older. The gender makeup of the town was 48.0% male and 52.0% female.

2000 census

As of the census of 2000, there were 911 people, 412 households, and 278 families living in the town. The racial makeup of the town was 98.68% White, 0.44% Asian, 0.22% Pacific Islander, and 0.66% from two or more races. Hispanic or Latino of any race were 0.33% of the population.

There were 412 households, out of which 23.1% had children under the age of 18 living with them, 60.7% were married couples living together, 4.9% had a female householder with no husband present, and 32.5% were non-families. 26.2% of all households were made up of individuals, and 11.7% had someone living alone who was 65 years of age or older. The average household size was 2.21 and the average family size was 2.65.

In the town, the population was spread out, with 18.0% under the age of 18, 5.3% from 18 to 24, 21.3% from 25 to 44, 34.8% from 45 to 64, and 20.6% who were 65 years of age or older. The median age was 49 years. For every 100 females, there were 100.2 males. For every 100 females age 18 and over, there were 95.5 males.

The median income for a household in the town was $36,458, and the median income for a family was $41,875. Males had a median income of $26,923 versus $24,750 for females. The per capita income for the town was $23,565. About 7.6% of families and 9.7% of the population were below the poverty line, including 13.5% of those under age 18 and 2.2% of those age 65 or over.

Points of interest

 Four Season Farm, the nationally known organic farm of Eliot Coleman and Barbara Damrosch.
 Good Life Center, the hand-built last home of Helen and Scott Nearing, dedicated to advancing their vision of social justice and simple living.
 Brooksville Historical Society Museum
 Holbrook Island Sanctuary State Park, a protected natural area on Penobscot Bay for hiking and wildlife watching.
 The reversing falls on the Bagaduce River at Davis Narrows, where Routes 175 and 176 cross the river.
Bagaduce Lunch, a James Beard Foundation Award winning clam shack

National historic sites 

 Topside, added to the National Register of Historic Places August 13, 1975.
 Von Mach Site, added to the National Register of Historic Places January 17, 1989.
 West Brooksville Congregational Church, added to the National Register of Historic Places June 20, 1995.

Notable people

 Eliot Coleman, farmer, author, agricultural researcher and educator, and proponent of organic farming
 Melissa Coleman, author, columnist, and writer
 Clarence Milville Condon, Medal of Honor recipient during the Philippine–American War
 Archibald Cox, Harvard law professor, 31st United States Solicitor General, and first special prosecutor in the Watergate scandal, fired on the order of Richard Nixon in the Saturday Night Massacre
 Daniel Hoffman, poet laureate of the United States, 1973–1974
 Edmund von Mach, German-American art historian
 John Mack, Civil War seaman, Medal of Honor recipient
 Robert McCloskey, award-winning author and illustrator of children's books
 Helen Nearing wife of Scott Nearing, advocates of simple living, and leaders of the back-to-the-land movement
 Scott Nearing, husband of Helen Nearing
 Clara Parkes, author, yarn critic, and wool expert
 Robert Shetterly, painter, Americans Who Tell The Truth
 Peter Suber, a leader in the movement for open access to research
 David Atwood Wasson, early American intellectual leader

References

Further reading

 Ellenore W. Doudiet, Majabigwaduce: Castine, Penobscot, Brooksville, Castine Scientific Society, 1978.
 Reta Farnham Hunter, Anita’s Island: A History of Holbrook Island, privately published, 2012. 
 Stanley Joseph and Lynn Karlin, Maine Farm: A Year of Country Life, Random House, 1991.
 Joan McCracken, All Around Town: The Best of the Brooksville Breeze (2007-2015), 2016.
 LeCain W. Smith, Maritime History of Brooksville, Brooksville Historical Society, 2005.
 Walter A. Snow (ed.), Brooksville, Maine: A Town in the Revolution, Downeast Graphics, 1976.
 George Augustus Wheeler,  History of Castine, Penobscot, and Brooksville, Maine, including the ancient settlement of Pentagoet. Bangor: Burr & Robinson, 1875.

External links
 Town of Brooksville, Maine
 Brooksville Free Public Library
 Brooksville Historical Society
 

Towns in Hancock County, Maine
Towns in Maine